Lo So Shing is a village located on Lamma Island, the third largest island in the territory of Hong Kong.

Administration
Lo So Shing is a recognized village under the New Territories Small House Policy.

History
At the time of the 1911 census, the population of Lo So Shing was 75. The number of males was 30.

See also
 Lo So Shing Beach

References

External links

 Delineation of area of existing village Lo So Shing (Lamma South) for election of resident representative (2019 to 2022)

Villages in Islands District, Hong Kong
Lamma Island